Pocona Municipality is the third municipal section of the Carrasco Province in the Cochabamba Department in Bolivia. Its seat is Pocona. At the time of census 2001 the municipality had 13,488 inhabitants.

Geography 
Some of the highest mountains of the municipality are listed below:

Cantons 
The municipality is divided into five cantons.

People 
Some data:

Languages 
The languages spoken in the Pocona Municipality are mainly Quechua and Spanish.

Economy 
The principal economic activities are the cultivation of stone fruit and potatoes and tourism.

Places of interest 
The monumental Inca site of Inkallaqta is situated in the Pocona Municipality.

See also 
 Julpe River

References

External links 
 www.enlared.org.bo / Statistical data: Education (Spanish)

Municipalities of the Cochabamba Department